Colin Robertson (born 19 June 1957) is a former Australian rules footballer who represented Hawthorn in the Victorian Football League (VFL) during the 1980s.

A hard running player, Robertson was a versatile footballer who could play across half back, on wing or on the ball. Robertson spent six seasons with Tasmanian club Wynyard, playing in premierships with the club in 1975 and 1979 before joining Hawthorn the following season. Robertson became a key part of the club's dominance during the early 1980s. In the 1983 VFL Grand Final he became the first Tasmanian to win the Norm Smith Medal after a superb tagging job on Essendon's dangerous rover Tim Watson.

In 1987 Robertson returned to Tasmania to captain the Burnie Hawks in the Tasmanian State League for three seasons. In the last season he was Captain-Coach. He was non-playing coach of Wynyard in 1991 and 1992.

In June 2011 Robertson was upgraded to Legend status in the Tasmanian Football Hall of Fame.

Statistics

|- style=background:#EAEAEA
| scope=row | 1980 ||  || 32
| 11 || 3 || 6 || 94 || 50 || 144 || 20 ||  || 0.3 || 0.5 || 8.5 || 4.5 || 13.1 || 1.8 ||  || 3
|-
| scope=row | 1981 ||  || 32
| 18 || 17 || 12 || 218 || 111 || 329 || 54 ||  || 0.9 || 0.7 || 12.1 || 6.2 || 18.3 || 3.0 ||  || 7
|- style=background:#EAEAEA
| scope=row | 1982 ||  || 32
| 19 || 13 || 14 || 199 || 150 || 349 || 70 ||  || 0.7 || 0.7 || 10.5 || 7.9 || 18.4 || 3.7 ||  || 5
|-
| scope=row bgcolor=F0E68C | 1983# ||  || 32
| 17 || 3 || 6 || 182 || 142 || 324 || 50 ||  || 0.2 || 0.4 || 10.7 || 8.4 || 19.1 || 2.9 ||  || 2
|- style=background:#EAEAEA
| scope=row | 1984 ||  || 32
| 23 || 14 || 14 || 258 || 188 || 446 || 68 ||  || 0.6 || 0.6 || 11.2 || 8.2 || 19.4 || 3.0 ||  || 0
|-
| scope=row | 1985 ||  || 32
| 14 || 6 || 3 || 127 || 104 || 231 || 33 ||  || 0.4 || 0.2 || 9.1 || 7.4 || 16.5 || 2.4 ||  || 2
|- style=background:#EAEAEA
| scope=row | 1986 ||  || 32
| 14 || 6 || 2 || 111 || 117 || 228 || 30 ||  || 0.4 || 0.1 || 7.9 || 8.4 || 16.3 || 2.1 ||  || 6
|- class=sortbottom
! colspan=3 | Career
! 116 !! 62 !! 57 !! 1189 !! 862 !! 2051 !! 325 !!  !! 0.5 !! 0.5 !! 10.3 !! 7.4 !! 17.7 !! 2.8 !!  !! 25
|}

Honours and achievements
Team
 VFL premiership player: 1983
 McClelland Trophy: 1986

Individual
 Norm Smith Medal: 1983
 Tasmanian Football Hall of Fame: 2005 Inductee
 Tasmanian Football Hall of Fame – Legend Status: 2011

References

External links

1957 births
Living people
Australian rules footballers from Tasmania
Hawthorn Football Club players
Hawthorn Football Club Premiership players
Burnie Hawks Football Club players
Wynyard Football Club players
Tasmanian State of Origin players
Norm Smith Medal winners
Tasmanian Football Hall of Fame inductees
People from Wynyard, Tasmania
One-time VFL/AFL Premiership players